Fältmarskalk (Field marshal) was a Swedish military rank equivalent to present day NATO OF-10. Sometimes written as General Fältmarskalk (General Field Marshal, or German equivalent Generalfeldmarschall).

The rank of field marshal – as the highest in the Swedish Army – existed from the end of the 16th century up to 1824. The rank has not been used in Sweden since 1972; previously and for a long time, it had been used only in wartime. Sweden has had a total of 77 field marshals.

Riksmarskalk (Marshal of the Realm) was earlier the most senior military officer in Sweden (still second to the Monarch), but is now the senior courtier of the Royal Court.

See also
 List of Swedish field marshals
 Field marshal (Finland)
 Generalissimo
 Supreme Commander of the Swedish Armed Forces

References

 
 
Military ranks of Sweden

sv:Fältmarskalk